Gustav Hämmerlin (December 23, 1880 – April 15, 1966) was an American gymnast. He competed in three events at the 1904 Summer Olympics.

References

External links
 

1880 births
1966 deaths
American male artistic gymnasts
Olympic gymnasts of the United States
Gymnasts at the 1904 Summer Olympics
Sportspeople from Mulhouse
French emigrants to the United States